= Johanna Nilsson (author) =

Swedish author

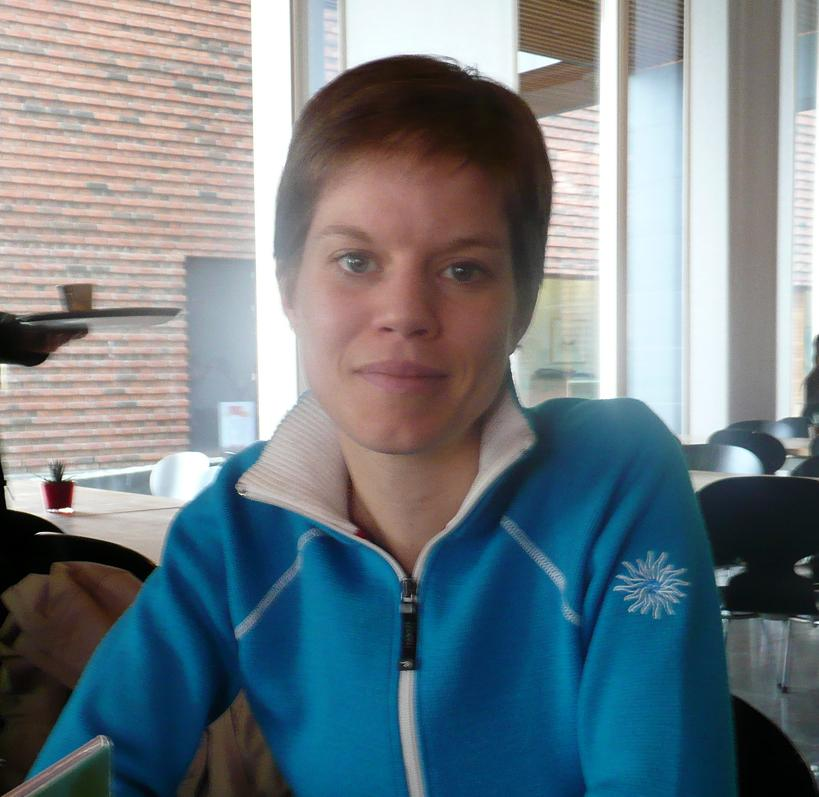
Johanna Nilsson (2008)

Elsa Johanna Nilsson (born October 1, 1973, in Uppsala) is a Swedish author. She has published books under the pseudonym Amanda Lind. She has been the recipient of a Wahlström & Widstrands litteraturpris in 2004, and a Karin Boyes litterära pris in 2005.
